Zaccaria Hamlili (born 27 April 1991) is an Italian professional footballer who plays as a midfielder for Monopoli.

Club career
On 28 January 2021, Hamlili was loaned to Gubbio for the rest of the season.

On 30 August 2021 he signed a three-year contract with Monopoli.

References

External links 
 
 
 

1991 births
Living people
Sportspeople from the Province of Brescia
Italian footballers
Association football midfielders
Serie C players
Serie D players
Brescia Calcio players
Virtus Entella players
A.C. Cuneo 1905 players
Forlì F.C. players
U.S. Ancona 1905 players
U.S. Pistoiese 1921 players
S.S.C. Bari players
A.S. Gubbio 1910 players
S.S. Monopoli 1966 players